Fredrika is a locality situated in Åsele Municipality, Västerbotten County, Sweden with 215 inhabitants in 2010.

Buddharama Temple

In 2004 it was decided that a Buddhist temple was to be built near Fredrika. As of 2011 the construction is still ongoing.

References

External links

Populated places in Västerbotten County
Populated places in Åsele Municipality